John Awdry Julius (1874–1956) was  Dean of Christchurch from 1927 to 1940.

He was born in Norwich and educated at Melbourne Grammar School, Christ's College, Christchurch and Keble College, Oxford. He was ordained deacon in 1897 and priest in 1898. and began his ecclesiastical career with a curacy in Kettering.
Emigrating to New Zealand he was: Vicar of Papanui, (1904–14); then Waimate, (1914–20); and Timaru, (1921–27). As well as his position as dean he was Archdeacon of Timaru, (1922–27); Rangiora, (1928–34); and Christchurch, (1934–37).

Awdry was the son of Churchill Julius and brother of George Julius. He died on 18 July 1956.

References

1874 births
Clergy from Norwich
People educated at Melbourne Grammar School
People educated at Christ's College, Christchurch
Alumni of Keble College, Oxford
English emigrants to Australia
English emigrants to New Zealand
Archdeacons of Timaru
Archdeacons of Rangiora
Archdeacons of Christchurch
Deans of Christchurch
1941 deaths
Awdry